Strange Days may refer to:

Film and television
 Strange Days (film), a 1995 science fiction film directed by Kathryn Bigelow
 "Strange Days" (Entourage), an episode of the TV series Entourage

Literature
 Strange Days: Fabulous Journeys with Gardner Dozois, a short-story collection by Gardner Dozois
 Strange Days: My Life with and Without Jim Morrison, a memoir by Patricia Kennealy-Morrison
 "Strange Days", a regular section of the magazine Fortean Times

Music
 Strange Days (Doors album), a 1967 album by The Doors
 "Strange Days" (Doors song), the title track of the Doors album
 Strange Days (band), a 1980s British band
 "Strange Days" (Matthew Good Band song)
 Strange Days, an album by Government Alpha
 Strange Days (Natacha Atlas album), 2019
 Strange Days (The Struts album), 2020
 "Strange Days", a song by Brazil from The Philosophy of Velocity
 "Strange Days", a song by Creepy
 "Strange Days", a song by Humble Pie, the B-side of the single "Big Black Dog"

See also 
 "Strange Daze", a song by Quiet Riot from Rehab